Yanbei Subdistrict is a subdistrict in Qihe County, Shandong, China. , it administers Tiebei Residential Community and the following 92 villages:

Villages

Xiaoli Village
Beisong Village
Huobazhang Village
Nanmazhuang Village
Yuansun Village
Manziying Village
Xiaohuang Village
Heli Village
Yangshi'an Village
Hanzhuang Village
Wangguan Village
Xiaodai Village
Zhangxin Village
Hudian Village
Dingzhuang Village
Tangzhuang Village
Wasong Village
Xichenzhuang Village
Sunzhuang Village
Tantun Village
Shiziliu Village
Zongwu Village
Gaozhuang Village
Qianyang Village
Caiwang Village
Huangzhuang Village
Dongmazhuang Village
Houyang Village
Liumiao Village
Daguazhang Village
Yaozhuang Village

Laoxu Village
Fawang Village
Maoguanzhou Village
Xiwei Village
Beisun Village
Sangyuanzhao Village
Yuanxin Village
Jiaobin Village
Mazhai Village
Cuizhuang Village
Dongchenzhuang Village
Shiziwang Village
Xiao'an Village
Huangpu Village
Liu'an Village
Liguan Village
Duxi Village
Dudong Village
Linzhuang Village
Huguan Village
Liuzhuang Village
Anfu Village
Zhaozhuang Village
Liushan Village
Xiaofei Village
Liudong Village
Liuhang Village
Haozhuang Village
Quanyu Village
Zhouzhuang Village
Xinfatun Village

Beimazhuang Village
Donggao Village
Xufang Village
Xigao Village
Jianchang Village
Shimiao Village
Beiwei Village
Xutun Village
Yuanzhuang Village
Housi Village
Maguan Village
Gezhuang Village
Liuming Village
Yihe Village
Tangzhuang Village
Xiaoxin Village
Louzizhang Village
Wawudian Village
Chunli Village
Damoliu Village
Liuxi Village
Baoguan Village
Nanxie Village
Caidong Village
Qianhousui Village
Caixi Village
Yongfeng Village
Nanbei Village
Kaitai Village
Laoliu Village

See also 
 List of township-level divisions of Shandong

References 

Township-level divisions of Shandong
Qihe County